J. Schneider (date of birth unknown) was a Swiss footballer who played for FC Basel as forward or midfielder during the 1890s.

Football career
FC Basel was founded on 15 November 1893 and Schneider joined the club about two years later, during their 1895–96 season. Schneider played his first game for the club in the home game on 23 November 1895 as Basel played their first ever game against Anglo-American Club Zürich.

Schneider stayed with the club for just this one season and during this time he played five games for Basel without scoring a goal.

Notes

Footnotes

References

Sources
 Rotblau: Jahrbuch Saison 2017/2018. Publisher: FC Basel Marketing AG. 
 Die ersten 125 Jahre. Publisher: Josef Zindel im Friedrich Reinhardt Verlag, Basel. 
 Verein "Basler Fussballarchiv" Homepage
(NB: Despite all efforts, the editors of these books and the authors in "Basler Fussballarchiv" have failed to be able to identify all the players, their date and place of birth or date and place of death, who played in the games during the early years of FC Basel)

FC Basel players
Swiss men's footballers
Association football midfielders
Association football forwards
Date of birth missing
Date of death missing